The Advanced Aviation Explorer is a two-seat ultralight marketed in kit form, for amateur construction. It is a high-wing taildragger aircraft of pusher configuration with tandem seating.

Design and development
The aircraft is a development of the Talon XP which in turn traces its lineage to the Maxair Drifter. The Explorer has been produced by a number of companies and under a variety of names.

The main advance over the Drifter is the Explorer's use of main wing struts and jury struts in place of cable bracing. Like all aircraft in this family they feature excellent visibility, especially from the front seat when the optional fibreglass cockpit pod is removed. As a result, the design is often employed as a camera platform. It can be flown on floats and has been used for banner towing.

Construction is of bolted aluminium tube, with the flying surfaces covered in pre-sewn Dacron envelopes. The kit takes about 150–250 hours to assemble.

Variants
Explorer
Initial version, derived from the Talon XP, but with struts in place of the cable-braced wing. Produced by Advanced Aviation, no longer in production.
Zephyr
Similar to the Explorer, but produced by Arnet Pereyra Inc, no longer in production. Also known as the Zephyr II, 40 reported flying in 1998/2001.
Toucan
In production, with 10 flying at the end of 2011.
Barracuda
Aero Adventure Aviation produced version powered by the  Rotax 912,  gross weight, optimized for amphibious floats. Out of production, with 1 flying at the end of 2007.

Specifications (Toucan)

See also

References

External links
Official Aero Adventure Toucan website

Homebuilt aircraft
1990s United States ultralight aircraft
Single-engined pusher aircraft
Explorer
Toucan